Yang Xiaobo, may refer to:

 Yang Xiaobo (Hubei politician) (1963–2020), Chinese politician, Mayor of Huangshi, Hubei
 Yang Xiaobo (Shanxi politician) (born 1971), Chinese politician, former Mayor of Gaoping, Shanxi